On the morning of March 9, 2012, a long-lived hailstorm hit the Hawaiian islands of Oahu and Lanai. The hailstorm was produced by a supercell thunderstorm. This event produced the largest hailstone ever recorded in Hawaii since records began in 1950. National Weather Service meteorologist Tom Birchard stated that the event was "unprecedented."

Non-supercellular waterspouts are not uncommon (the State of Hawaii records an average of one waterspout/tornado per year), this mesocyclone-induced waterspout tracked inland for 1.5 miles, becoming an EF0 tornado that caused minor damage to the Enchanted Lakes subdivision of Kailua at 7:10 am Hawaiian-Aleutian Time.

Confirmed tornadoes

See also
 List of costly or deadly hailstorms
 List of Hawaii tornadoes

References 

2012 in Hawaii
2012 natural disasters in the United States
Natural disasters in Hawaii
2012-03